Rigiopappus is a genus of North American plants in the tribe Astereae within the family Asteraceae. It is closely related to genus Pentachaeta.

Species
The only known species is Rigiopappus leptocladus, sometimes known as wireweed. It is an annual plant sending up slender stems terminating in small daisylike yellow flowers. It is native to the western United States (California, Nevada, Oregon, Washington, Idaho).

References

External links

Jepson Manual Treatment
USDA Plants Profile
Photo gallery

Astereae
Monotypic Asteraceae genera
Flora of the Western United States
Flora of California
Taxa named by Asa Gray